Stefan Németh (born 1973, Baden, Austria) is an electronic musician and biologist. With Martin Brandlmayr and John Norman he founded the band Radian, which performed on various international festivals and released a series of albums for Thrill Jockey records, Rhiz and Mego. In 2003 he and Michaela Schwentner launched the Mosz record label for electronic and "non-conform" music, focusing on productions aside established genres. In parallel to his activities within live projects and the record label (which Schwentner runs on her own since 2008) Németh creates soundtracks for short films and experimental videos. The list of film directors he worked with includes: Dariusz Kowalski, Lotte Schreiber, Anu Pennanen, Lynne Marsh, Maia Gusberti, Norbert Pfaffenbichler, Thomas Fuerhapter and Tinhoko.

On stage he has collaborated with: Steven Hess and Bernhard Breuer (as Innode); Martin Brandlmayr and John Norman (as Radian); Florian Kmet (as Lokai); Martin Siewert, Oskar Aichinger, Franz Hautzinger, Werner Dafeldecker.

Since 2012 he also runs the platform Sonotope, which publishes audio works by or related to Németh.

Selected discography 
 németh - koi (12"/DL) Sonotope, 2015
 innode - gridshifter (LP/DL) Editions Mego, 2013
 lokai - transition (CD/LP) Thrill Jockey, 2009
 radian - chimeric (CD/LP) Thrill Jockey, 2009
 németh - film (CD) Thrill Jockey, 2008
 lokai - 7 million (CD) Mosz, 2005
 radian - juxtaposition (CD/LP) Thrill Jockey, 2004
 radian - rec.extern (CD/LP) Thrill Jockey, 2002
 radian - tg11 (CD) Mego/Rhiz, 2000
 radian - radian (CD) Rhiz, 1998

External links 
 SONOTOPE platform
 Editions Mego
 Thrill Jockey Records

Austrian electronic musicians
Austrian biologists
Living people
1973 births